"I Care for You" may refer to:
I Care 4 U, a compilation album by American singer Aaliyah.
I Care 4 U (song), a song from the album I Care 4 U.
I Care for You (Jennifer Braun song), a song by German singer Jennifer Braun.